Kenneth Turan (born October 27, 1946) is an American retired film critic, author, and lecturer in the Master of Professional Writing Program at the University of Southern California. He was a film critic for the Los Angeles Times from 1991 until 2020 and was described by The Hollywood Reporter as "arguably the most widely read film critic in the town most associated with the making of movies".

Early life
Turan was raised in an observant Jewish family in Brooklyn, New York. He received a bachelor's degree from Swarthmore College and a master's degree in journalism from Columbia University. At Swarthmore, he was roommates with the mathematician and science fiction author Rudy Rucker.

Career
Before becoming a film critic, Turan was a staff writer for The Washington Post.

Turan was a film critic for The Progressive, a magazine published in Madison, Wisconsin, and in 1991 he became a film critic for The Los Angeles Times. In 1993, he was named the director of the Los Angeles Times Book Prizes.

Turan announced his retirement from The Los Angeles Times on March 25, 2020.

He is featured in the documentary For the Love of Movies: The Story of American Film Criticism (2009) discussing his public quarrel with film director James Cameron, who e-mailed the Los Angeles Times editors calling for Turan to be fired after he wrote a scathing review of Titanic (1997). Cameron accused Turan of using an "incessant rain of personal barbs" and using his "bully pulpit not only to attack my film, but the entire film industry and its audiences".

Turan founded the KUSC radio program Arts Alive. He provides regular movie reviews for NPR's Morning Edition and serves on the board of directors of the Yiddish Book Center.

Publications
 Not to Be Missed: Fifty-Four Favorites From a Lifetime of Film (2014)
Free for All: Joe Papp, the Public, and the Greatest Theater Story Ever Told (2009) with Joseph Papp
Now In Theaters Everywhere. (2006)
Never Coming To A Theater Near You. (2004)
Sundance to Sarajevo: Film Festivals and the World They Made. (2002)
Call Me Anna: The Autobiography of Patty Duke. (1987)
I'd Rather Be Wright: Memoirs of an Itinerant Tackle. (1974)
Sinema: American Pornographic Films and the People Who Make Them. (1974)
The Future is Now: George Allen, Pro Football's Most Controversial Coach. with William Gildea (1972)

Awards
2006: Special Citation. National Society of Film Critics Awards.

References

External links
NPR biography
USC Kenneth Turan

1946 births
Living people
American film critics
National Society of Film Critics Members
Jewish American journalists
People from Brooklyn
Swarthmore College alumni
University of Southern California faculty
NPR personalities
Los Angeles Times people
Journalists from New York City
20th-century American journalists
American male journalists
21st-century American journalists
21st-century American Jews